The Bayer designation Omega Tauri (ω Tau, ω Tauri) is shared by two star systems, ω1 Tauri and ω2 Tauri, in the constellation Taurus. They are separated by 2.13° on the sky.

 ω1 Tauri
 ω2 Tauri

Tauri, Omega
Taurus (constellation)